Lippoldswilen is a village and former municipality in the canton of Thurgau, Switzerland.

It was first recorded in the year 1303 as Lupoltwile.

The municipality also contained the village Unterstöcken as well as six other hamlets. It had 153 inhabitants in 1850, which remained stable with 154 in 1900, but then decreased to 138 in 1950 and 97 in 1990.

In 1996, the municipality was merged with other neighboring municipalities including Alterswilen, Altishausen, Dotnacht, Ellighausen, Hugelshofen, Neuwilen and Siegershausen, to form a new and larger municipality Kemmental.

References

Former municipalities of Thurgau
Villages in Switzerland